Fencing events were contested at the 1991 Summer Universiade in Sheffield, England.

Medal overview

Men's events

Women's events

Medal table

References
 Universiade fencing medalists on HickokSports

1991 Summer Universiade
Universiade
Fencing at the Summer Universiade
International fencing competitions hosted by the United Kingdom